Ballads and Bards is a Canadian country music television series which aired nationally on CBC Television in 1963.

Premise
Country music was featured in this Winnipeg-produced series, adapted from the radio series Shenandoah. Hosts were musicians Reg Gibson (Swingalong) and Jim Pirie (Red River Jamboree).

Scheduling
This series was initially broadcast from June 1962 on CBC's Winnipeg and Edmonton stations. The 15-minute series was broadcast nationally on CBC Saturdays at 6:30 p.m. from 4 May to 29 June 1963.

References

External links
 

CBC Television original programming
1963 Canadian television series debuts
1963 Canadian television series endings
Television shows filmed in Winnipeg